Several elections took place in the U.S. state of Georgia in 2022. The general election was held on November 8, 2022. A runoff election for one of Georgia's seats in the United States Senate was held on December 6, 2022. The runoff was scheduled because none of the candidates for Senate received 50% of the statewide vote in the general election. In addition to the Senate seat, all of Georgia's seats in the United States House of Representatives were up for election. Also up for election were all of Georgia's executive officers and legislative seats, as well as one seat on the Georgia Public Service Commission. The Republican Party decisively won every single statewide office in Georgia except for the Federal Senate race which narrowly went Democratic in 2022. 

This was the first election following the 2020 United States redistricting cycle.

Federal offices

United States House of Representatives

Following the 2020 election, Democrats held their largest share of Georgia congressional seats since 2008 (and largest in the post-2010 redistricting cycle), with the gain of the 7th district by Carolyn Bourdeaux. In addition, the number of women representing Georgia grew from 1 to 4 with the re-election of Democrat Lucy McBath and the elections of Democrats Bordeaux, Nikema Williams and Republican Marjorie Taylor Greene, resulting in the first Georgia delegation with more than one woman in membership.

United States Senate

Incumbent Democrat Raphael Warnock won the 2020–2021 special election against incumbent Republican Kelly Loeffler to fill the remainder of former Sen. Johnny Isakson's term. (Isakson had resigned at the end of 2019, and Loeffler was appointed by Governor Brian Kemp following Isakson's resignation.) No candidate in the open election on November 3 received the 50% required by Georgia law to avoid a runoff, a type of election colloquially known as a "jungle primary"—Warnock received just 32.9% of the vote—and so a runoff election between Warnock and Loeffler was held on January 5, 2021, which Warnock won with 51% of the vote.

Former Republican senator David Perdue, who lost his race to Democratic challenger Jon Ossoff in 2021, filed paperwork to run for this seat. A week after filing the paperwork, however, Perdue announced that he would not pursue another race for the Senate. Loeffler considered running again, while former U.S. Representative Doug Collins declined to run after heavy speculation that he would enter the race. Herschel Walker, a professional football player, announced in August 2021 that he would join the Republican primary.

Governor

Governor Brian Kemp was elected in 2018 with 50.2% of the vote. He ran for re-election, facing primary challenges from former U.S. Senator David Perdue and several other candidates.

Stacey Abrams, former minority leader of the Georgia House of Representatives and Democratic nominee for governor in 2018, ran unchallenged for the Democratic nomination.

Lieutenant Governor

Secretary of State

Incumbent Secretary of State Brad Raffensperger ran for re-election, facing primary challenges from Republican Congressman Jody Hice and former Alpharetta mayor David Belle Isle.

State Representative Bee Nguyen, former Cobb County Democratic Party Chairman, Dr. Michael Owens, former Darton State College professor Manswell Peterson (withdrawn), and former Fulton County Commission Chair John Eaves,  and former Georgia State Senator and Mayor of Milledgeville Floyd L. Griffin Jr. all declared their candidacies for the Democratic nomination.

Attorney General

Republican incumbent Attorney General Chris Carr ran for re-election.

State Senator Jen Jordan ran for the Democratic nomination. Charlie Bailey, former Fulton County Senior Assistant District Attorney and 2018 Democratic nominee for Attorney General, withdrew as a candidate in this race to run for Lieutenant Governor.

Labor Commissioner

Incumbent Republican Mark Butler was eligible to seek a fourth term in office, but chose to retire.

Republican primary

Candidates

Nominee
Bruce Thompson, state senator

Eliminated in primary 
Kartik Bhatt, consumer-member of the Georgia Board of Examiners for the Certification of Water and Wastewater Treatment Plant Operators and Laboratory Analysts
Mike Coan, former state representative

Declined
Mark Butler, incumbent labor commissioner

Polling

Primary results

Democratic primary

Candidates

Nominee
William Boddie, state representative

Eliminated in runoff
Nicole Horn, entrepreneur

Eliminated in initial primary 
Lester Jackson, state senator
Thomas Dean, courier
Nadia Surrency, entrepreneur and philanthropist

Libertarian primary

Candidates

Nominee
Emily Anderson, printer

General election

Results

State Superintendent of Schools

Incumbent Republican superintendent Richard Woods sought a third term in office.

Republican primary

Candidates

Nominee
Richard Woods, incumbent superintendent

Eliminated in primary 
John Barge, former superintendent, candidate for Governor of Georgia in 2014, candidate for superintendent in 2018, and candidate for U.S. House in 2020

Polling

Primary results

Democratic primary

Candidates

Nominee
Alisha Thomas Searcy, former state representative (2003–2015) and candidate for State School Superintendent in 2014

Eliminated in primary 
Jaha Howard, Cobb County school board member
Currey Hitchens, lawyer
James Morrow Jr., teacher

Withdrew
Everton Blair, member and former chair of the Gwinnett County school board

Endorsements

Primary results

Libertarian primary

Candidates

Did not file
Ken Pullin, former Republican state representative

General election

Results

Insurance and Safety Fire Commissioner

Incumbent Republican commissioner John King, who was appointed to the position in 2019 after the resignation of Jim Beck, ran for a full term.

Republican primary

Candidates

Nominee
John King, incumbent commissioner

Eliminated in primary 
Patrick Witt, former Trump administration official (previously ran for U.S. House)
Ben Cowart, property developer

Endorsements

Polling

Primary results

Democratic primary

Candidates

Nominee
Janice Laws Robinson, insurance broker

Eliminated in runoff
Raphael Baker, insurance broker

Eliminated in initial primary 
Matthew Wilson, state representative

Endorsements

Primary results

Runoff results

General election

Results

Agriculture Commissioner

Incumbent Republican commissioner Gary Black was eligible to seek a fourth term in office, but instead chose to run for U.S. Senate.

Republican primary

Candidates

Nominee
Tyler Harper, state senator

Declined
Gary Black, incumbent commissioner (ran for U.S. Senate)

Endorsements

Primary results

Democratic primary

Candidates

Nominee
Nakita Hemingway, cut-flower farmer

Eliminated in primary 
Fred Swann, mushroom farmer and nominee for agriculture commissioner in 2018
Winfred Dukes, state representative

Did not file 
Deborah Jackson, attorney, former mayor of Lithonia, and candidate for U.S. Senate in 2020

Endorsements

Primary results

Libertarian primary

Candidates

Nominee
David Raudabaugh, salesman

General election

Results

Public Service Commission
On August 19, 2022, the U.S. Supreme Court upheld a ruling by Judge Steven D. Grimberg in the case Rose v. Raffensperger postponing both Georgia Public Service Commission elections which were due to be held on November 8, 2022. As a result, the following nominees for Districts 2 and 3 were removed from the general election ballot.

District 2

Incumbent Republican Commissioner Tim Echols ran for re-election.

Republican primary

Candidates

Nominee
Tim Echols, incumbent commissioner

Democratic primary

Candidates

Nominee
Patty Durand, former president of the Smart Energy Consumer Collaborative

Withdrew
Russell Edwards, Athens-Clarke County commissioner (endorsed Durand, remained on ballot)

Libertarian primary

Candidates

Nominee
Colin McKinney, physician

District 3 (Special)

On July 21, 2021, Republican Fitz Johnson was appointed by Governor Kemp to fill the vacancy created when incumbent commissioner Chuck Eaton resigned after being appointed to the Fulton County Superior Court. Johnson will run in the special election to serve the remainder of Eaton's term.

Republican primary

Candidates

Nominee
Fitz Johnson, incumbent commissioner

Democratic primary

Candidates

Nominee
Sheila Edwards, public relations professional and community activist

Eliminated in primary 
Chandra Farley, energy consultant and chair of the Georgia NAACP Environmental and Climate Justice Committee
Missy Moore, commercial insurance agency owner

General Assembly

All 56 State Senate and 180 State House seats were up for election. Republicans retained their majorities in both houses, though Democrats gained two seats in the Georgia House of Representatives and one in the Georgia Senate.

District Attorneys
9 out of 49 judicial circuits held elections for district attorney.

Judicial elections
Three seats on the Supreme Court of Georgia were up for nonpartisan statewide election to succeed justices David Nahmias, Carla W. McMillian and Shawn Ellen LaGrua.

Local elections
During the regular primary, most counties and several consolidated city-county governments held nonpartisan elections for mayor, select city council or county commission seats, and select board of education seats, including Columbus, Athens, and Augusta.

Notes

Partisan clients

References

 
2022
Georgia